K-1 World MAX 2010 –70 kg World Championship Tournament Final was a martial arts event to be held by the K-1 on Monday, November 8, 2010 at the Ryōgoku Kokugikan in Tokyo, Japan. It will be the 9th inaugural K-1 World Max Final, the culmination of a year full of regional elimination tournaments. All fights will follow K-1's classic tournament format and be conducted under K-1 Rules, three rounds of three minutes each, with a possible tiebreaker.

The qualification for the top eight fighters was held at the K-1 World MAX 2010 Final 16 Part 1 on July 5, 2010 in Tokyo, Japan and the K-1 World MAX 2010 Final 16 Part 2 on October 3, 2010 in Seoul, Korea.

Final 8 Participating Fighters

Qualifiers - Finalists 
  Albert Kraus
  Yoshihiro Sato
  Yuichiro "Jienotsu" Nagashima (K-1 World MAX 2010 –70 kg Japan Tournament Champion)
  Giorgio Petrosyan (Reigning K-1 World MAX 2009 Champion)
  Mohammed Khamal (K-1 World MAX 2010 West Europe Champion)
  Mike Zambidis
  Michał Głogowski
  Gago Drago

K-1 World Max 2010 Final bracket

FightCard

See also
List of K-1 events
List of K-1 champions
List of male kickboxers

References

External links
K-1 Official site

K-1 MAX events
2010 in kickboxing
Kickboxing in Japan
Sports competitions in Tokyo